Sultan Kayhan (born 1988) is a Swedish politician. , she serves as Member of the Riksdag representing the constituency of Stockholm Municipality. She became a member after Kadir Kasirga resigned.

References 

Living people
1988 births
Place of birth missing (living people)
21st-century Swedish women politicians
Members of the Riksdag from the Social Democrats
Members of the Riksdag 2018–2022
Women members of the Riksdag